Brachysomophis cirrocheilos, also known as the stargazer snake eel, is a benthic marine fish belonging to the family Ophichthidae.

It is widely distributed throughout the tropical waters of the Indian Ocean, the Red Sea, and the western Pacific Ocean. The stargazer snake eel is active at night, remaining immersed in the sediment by day, with just its head protruding.

Description
The body is triangular in cross-section, becoming cylindrical behind the vent and ending with a hard, pointed tip. The snout is moderately long and the lower jaw extends beyond the upper jaw. The two pairs of nostrils are very close together and have short tubes. The eyes are rather small and are on the flat, dorsal part of the head rather than on the sides. The mouth has a long cleft and the conical teeth are not visible when the mouth is closed; there are two rows of teeth in the upper jaw and one row on the lower jaw, as well as some canine-like teeth on the roof of the mouth. There are numerous barbels on both upper and lower lips. The pectoral fins are fairly short, and the origin of the dorsal fin lies behind the gill openings and the tips of the pectoral fins. There are neither pelvic fins nor caudal fin. There are between 135 and 140 vertebrae. The colour of the dorsal surface is pale brown, with darker smudges and speckles; the underside is creamy-white and the fins are dusky brown.

Distribution and habitat
Brachysomophis cirrocheilos is native to shallow tropical and subtropical waters in the western Indo-Pacific region, in both marine and brackish habitats. Its range extends from 39°N to 20°S, and from 35°E to 148°E; that is from East Africa and the Red Sea to Japan, Taiwan, and southward to northern Australia. It lives on soft sediment, usually near coastal reefs, burrowing into the sand or mud.

Ecology
Brachysomophis cirrocheilos is a nocturnal species. It submerges into the sediment tail first and remains there all day,  with just its eyes and the top of its head or its snout projecting; its cryptic colouration makes it difficult to observe. At night it leaves its burrow to forage for crustaceans and small fish. It has sometimes been observed in association with a cleaning shrimp, Ancylomenes magnificus, which rests on its head. The shrimp periodically swims away from the fish, returning later to perch on the fish's head once more. Brachysomophis cirrocheilos is not targeted by commercial fisheries and is not known to be edible.

References

External links
 Stargazer Snake Eel @ Fishes of Australia

Eels
Ophichthidae
Fish of the Indian Ocean
Fish of the Red Sea
Marine fauna of East Africa
Marine fish of Southeast Asia
Marine fish of Northern Australia
Taxa named by Pieter Bleeker
Fish described in 1857